The Effingham County Cultural Center and Museum is a historic building and museum located in Effingham, the county seat of Effingham County, Illinois. Built in 1871, the building was originally the Effingham County Courthouse.

The courthouse was started in 1870 and completed in 1871 at a cost of roughly $30,000. Its style is known as Second Empire, a style popular in the United States during the latter part of the nineteenth century, coming from France's Second Empire period of the late 18th century. There have been two minor changes to the exterior; in 1913 the bell tower was changed from the Second Empire style to a simple square with a pyramidal roof; and somewhat later the southeast exterior door was changed to permit handicapped access and a small porch roof was added to shelter the door.

In 2007, Effingham County constructed a new building, named the Effingham County Government Center, one block west of the 1871 courthouse, at which point the old courthouse was not longer used. Beginning in 2012, the old courthouse began use as a museum. The building has been listed on the US National Register of Historic Places since September 1985.

References

External links

County courthouses in Illinois
Government buildings completed in 1871
Courthouses on the National Register of Historic Places in Illinois
National Register of Historic Places in Effingham County, Illinois
Former courthouses in Illinois
Museums in Effingham County, Illinois